Dinocephalus ornatus is a species of beetle in the family Cerambycidae. It was described by Louis Péringuey in 1899. It is known from Tanzania, Mozambique, Somalia, Malawi, South Africa, Ethiopia, and Zambia. It contains the varietas Dinocephalus ornatus var. nigroannulatus.

References

Tragocephalini
Beetles described in 1899